In quantum mechanics, the Byers–Yang theorem states that all physical properties of a doubly connected system (an annulus) enclosing a magnetic flux  through the opening are periodic in the flux with period  (the magnetic flux quantum). The theorem was first stated and proven by Nina Byers and Chen-Ning Yang (1961), and further developed by Felix Bloch (1970).

Proof
An enclosed flux  corresponds to a vector potential  inside the annulus with a line integral  along any path  that circulates around once. One can try to eliminate this vector potential by the gauge transformation
 
of the wave function  of electrons at positions . The gauge-transformed wave function satisfies the same Schrödinger equation as the original wave function, but with a different magnetic vector potential . It is assumed that the electrons experience zero magnetic field  at all points  inside the annulus, the field being nonzero only within the opening (where there are no electrons). It is then always possible to find a function  such that  inside the annulus, so one would conclude that the system with enclosed flux  is equivalent to a system with zero enclosed flux.

However, for any arbitrary  the gauge transformed wave function is no longer single-valued: The phase of  changes by 
  
whenever one of the coordinates  is moved along the ring to its starting point.

Applications
An overview of physical effects governed by the Byers–Yang theorem is given by Yoseph Imry. These include the
Aharonov–Bohm effect, persistent current in normal metals, and flux quantization in superconductors.

References

Theorems in quantum mechanics